Erupa plumbealis is a moth in the family Crambidae. It was described by George Hampson in 1919. It is found in Colombia.

References

Erupini
Moths described in 1919